Gama is an administrative region in the Federal District in Brazil.

History

In August 1746, pioneer Antônio Bueno de Avezedo left Paracatu, Minas Gerais, leading a large group to the northwest. After having gone through rivers, tablelands and large brooks, on August 13 he arrived at a brook where he found gold. He founded a village, which he named “Santa Luzia”, paying homage to the saint of the day. This brook was known as “Rio Vermelho” (Red River), in reference to the waters, loamy due to gold washing. Santa Luzia village grew into today's Luziânia, Goiás.

By early 1747, the first clergyman, Luís da Gama Mendonça, had arrived at Santa Luiz, at Bueno’s request. It’s supposed that, in homage to the clergyman, the region was named “Gama”. The lands that today constitute the Administrative Region of Gama, in which the satellite city of Gama is located, belonged to local farmers.

When the capital of Brazil was transferred upcountry, the farmlands were dispossessed by the government of Goiás, between 1956 and 1958, under the responsibility of a Commission organized to transfer the capital of Brazil, presided over by Altamiro de Moura Pacheco.

President Juscelino Kubitschek visited Gama on October 2, 1956, on his first visit to the region where the new capital would be built. The city was initially created to shelter people resident in invasions or provisional shelters, or those that would work on Brasília’s construction, as one of the first so-called “satellite cities”, in accordance with law no. 3,751, approved on April 13, 1960.

Architect Paulo Hungria had, by May 1960, developed the blueprint of the city, which would have the form of a beehive, dividing it into five sectors: North, South, East, West and Centre. The Centre Sector (for trade activities) was not so detailed due to future needs. Notwithstanding this, engineer José Maciel de Paiva, by order of mayor Israel Pinheiro (former president of Novacap), was charged with setting up a pioneer center and promoting the first transferences from September 1960 on. He was assisted by an engineer, José Carlos Godoy, by an inspector, Agnelo Dias Correia, and by a master-builder, Joaquim Santana and others. The initial settlement was carried out by removing 30 families resident in the “Barragem do Paranoá”.

Later, the city received many of the former residents of “Vila Amaury” and “Vila Planalto”. In 1970, the inhabitants settled in the Industry Sector of Taguatinga were transferred.

Notable people
Kaká, footballer

Sport
The local professional association football team is SE Gama.

See also
List of administrative regions of the Federal District

References

External links

 Regional Administration of Gama website
 Government of the Federal District website

Administrative regions of Federal District (Brazil)